was a Japanese daimyō of the early Edo period.  He was the head of the Tsuwano Domain.

Early life
Masanori was the son of Kamei Korenori.

Masanori's early service began under Tokugawa Ieyasu in 1602, and in 1604 he was assigned as an attendant to Ieyasu's son Hidetada. His childhood name was Daishomaru (大小丸).

Family
 Father: Kamei Korenori
 Mother: Tago Shigemori’s daughter
 Wife: Kōmyōin
 Children:
 Kamei Tsunenori
 Kunimatsu
 daughter married Tsuzuki Shigetsune
 Kamei Koremasa by Kōmyōin

Daimyo
Upon the death of his father, Masanori inherited Shikano Domain.

Masanori was transferred to Tsuwano Domain in 1617.  His descendants continued to live at Tsuwano in Iwami Province.

References

External links
 "Kamei Korenori" on Shikano.net 

|-

Daimyo
1590 births
1619 deaths
Kamei clan